Janel Moloney is an American actress. She is best known for her role as Donna Moss on the television series The West Wing, a role for which she received nominations for Primetime Emmy Award for Outstanding Supporting Actress in a Drama Series in 2002 and 2004. From 2014 to 2017, she starred on the HBO drama The Leftovers.

Career

Television
Her early work included television guest roles on ER, Sports Night, The Adventures of Brisco County, Jr., and Murder, She Wrote. Starting in 1999, Moloney had a recurring role on The West Wing as Donna Moss, assistant and eventual love interest to Deputy White House Chief of Staff Josh Lyman (Bradley Whitford). Moloney was originally credited only as a guest star, but she appeared in every episode of the first season. From the second season onward, Moloney was listed in the main credits. Moloney has received two Emmy Award nominations, one in 2002 and one in 2004, for Outstanding Supporting Actress in a Drama.

Moloney appeared in the television film Bang Bang You're Dead with Thomas Cavanagh and Randy Harrison, which was first broadcast on October 13, 2002 on Showtime. She played the part of Amber Frey in the made-for-TV movie Amber Frey: Witness for the Prosecution, broadcast May 25, 2005 on CBS. In 2007, Moloney played Dana Chase, who has a relationship with Tommy Caffee (Jason Clarke) in six episodes of the second season of Brotherhood.

In 2008, Moloney appeared in one episode ("It's a Wonderful Lie") of House M.D. In 2008, she guest-starred in an episode of 30 Rock. Moloney appeared in the 3rd installment of the Lstudio.com web series Puppy Love.

In 2009, she appeared in the US series Life on Mars as Professor Pat Olsen in the episode "Revenge of the Broken Jaw". She also appeared in the episode "Faithfully" of Law & Order: Criminal Intent as Allison Wyler.

Theatre
In 2007, Moloney made her Off-Broadway stage debut as Theresa in the Playwrights Horizons production 100 Saints You Should Know, written by Kate Fodor and directed by Ethan McSweeny.<ref>Brantley, Ben."Theater Review: '100 Saints You Should Know'""The New York Times, September 19, 2007</ref> She appeared in the Off-Broadway play Love, Loss, and What I Wore in September through October 2, 2011.

Film
Moloney starred in the 2010 feature film Armless, as Anna. She made a brief appearance as Earlene in the 1995 Walter Hill directed western Wild Bill, and appears in the 2013 film Concussion''.

Personal life
Born in Woodland Hills, California, Moloney is the niece through marriage of actress Christine Ebersole, and attended the acting conservatory at SUNY Purchase. During the 2004 U.S. presidential campaign, she was an active supporter of John Kerry's campaign and made public appearances on its behalf. Moloney has a son, Julius, with composer Marcelo Zarvos.

Filmography

Film

Television

References

External links

Janel Moloney Listing, Internet Off-Broadway Database

American film actresses
American television actresses
Living people
State University of New York at Purchase alumni
People from Woodland Hills, Los Angeles
20th-century American actresses
21st-century American actresses
Actresses from Los Angeles
American stage actresses
Year of birth missing (living people)